Red Verona marble is a variety of limestone rock which takes its name from Verona in Northern Italy.

It includes internal skeletons of ammonites and belemnoidea rostra in a fecal pellets matrix. It has been quarried from Red Ammonitic facies of Verona or the sedimentary Scaglia Rossa, both in the Lessinia geographical area of the northern Veneto Prealps.

References

Limestone
Marble
Verona